Duhok Basketball Club is a Kurdish professional basketball club based in Duhok. The club competes in the Iraqi Division I Basketball League. Duhok Basketball Club was founded in 1972.

Honours

2012 FIBA Asia Champions Cup 3rd
2013 FIBA Asia Champions Cup 5th
2009 iraqi division I league 1st
2010 iraqi division I league 1st
2011 iraqi division I league 1st
2012 iraqi division I league 1st
2013 iraqi division I league 1st
2014 iraqi division I league 1st

References

External links
Asia-Basket.com Team Page

Basketball teams in Iraq